Reggina Calcio was re-promoted to Serie A, following a reliable performance in the 2001–02 Serie B, following its narrow relegation from the top tier. With Gianluca Savoldi and Davide Dionigi being supported by playmaker Francesco Cozza, Reggina had one of the most effective offenses in the league, and the third place was well clear of fifth-placed Napoli, the club which signed Reggina's successful coach Franco Colomba following the season's end.

Squad

Goalkeepers
  Emanuele Belardi
  Maurizio Franzone
  Martin Lejsal

Defenders
  Martin Jiránek
  Alessandro Zoppetti
  Giovanni Morabito
  Jorge Vargas
  Ivan Franceschini
  Francesco Baldini
  Antonio Giosa
  Giancarlo Cinetto
  Arnauld Mercier

Midfielders
  Ricardo Verón
  Salvatore Vicari
  José Mamede
  Francesco Cozza
  Julio León
  Damián Álvarez
  Mozart
  Stefano Casale
  Salvatore Ricca

Attackers
  Gianluca Savoldi
  Davide Dionigi
  Erjon Bogdani
  Gustavo Reggi
  Mario La Canna
  Gianluca Macrì

Serie B

Reggina 1914 seasons
Reggina